This is a list of notable people from Košice, Slovakia

B
 Frigyes Bán, Hungarian film director
 János Batsányi, poet and Hungarian language regenerate, worked and lived in Košice
 Gyula Benczúr, painter, started to learn in secondary school in Košice
 Jiří Bicek, ice-hockey player, won Stanley cup 2003 with New Jersey Devils
 Stephen Bocskay, prince of Transylvania, died in Košice

C
 Michal Čekovský, basketball player, currently with the Maryland Terrapins
 Erik Černák, professional ice hockey player, born in Košice
 Lajos Csordák, painter, was born and died in Košice

D
 David Dobrik, YouTube personality
 Vladimír Dravecký, Slovak ice-hockey player for the HC Oceláři Třinec, in the Czech Extraliga

E
 János Esterházy, ethnic Hungarian politician in former Czechoslovakia, won parliament mandate in Košice in 1935
 Edith Eger, Holocaust survivor, psychologist and author of “The Choice”

G
 Radola Gajda, commander of the Russian Czechoslovak Legion, fascist politician, was given command of the 11th Division in Košice in 1922
 Dr. William Ganz, cardiologist co-invented the pulmonary artery catheter, born in Košice
 Béla Gerster, architect of the Corinth Canal and co-architect of the Panama Canal, born in Košice
 Jozef Gönci, Slovak sport shooter and Olympic bronze medallist twice

H 
 Elchanan Heilprin, rabbi, born in Košice, in former Czechoslovakia
 Martina Hingis, Swiss naturalised tennis player, born in Košice, in former Czechoslovakia

I
Julia Indichova, American reproductive healthcare activist and author, born in Košice, in former Czechoslovakia

J
 Július Jakoby, painter, born and died in Košice
 Vladimír Janočko, Slovak football player, born in Košice
 Christián Jaroš, Slovak ice hockey player for the Ottawa Senators
 Tomáš Jurčo, Slovak ice hockey player for the Springfield Thunderbirds in the AHL

K
 Ferenc Kazinczy, Hungarian author, regenerator of the Hungarian language, studied, lived and worked in Košice
 Karol Kisel, Slovak footballer, born in Košice
 Gyula Kosice, Argentine sculptor, plastic artist, theoretician and poet
 Alex Král, Czech footballer born in Košice
 Juraj Kuniak, Slovak poet and writer, born in Košice
 Andrej Kvašňák, legendary Slovak football player

M
 Pál Maléter, military leader of the 1956 Hungarian Revolution, started to serve as a professional army officer in the Hungarian military in Košice
 Sándor Márai, Hungarian writer, born in Košice
 Martin Marinčin, Slovak ice-hockey player for the Edmonton Oilers team in the NHL

N
 Ladislav Nagy, ice-hockey player and former NHL player
 Imre Németh, Hungarian hammer fall champion, born in Košice

P
 Pavol Paška, Speaker of the National Council of Slovakia (2006-2010, 2012-2014)
 Róbert Petrovický, Slovak ice hockey and former NHL player, born in Košice
 István Pongrácz,  martyr killed by George I Rákóczi's soldiers in 1619
 Jozef Psotka, mountaineer, born in Košice

R
 Arpád Račko, sculptor, worked in Košice
 Francis II Rákóczi, Prince of Transylvania and leader of anti-Habsburg uprisings, stayed in Košice and his remains are buried there

S
 Blessed Sister Sára Salkaházi, Sister of Social Service, martyr murdered by the Arrow Cross Party in Budapest
 Marek Sapara, football player
 Anna Karolína Schmiedlová, tennis player
 Rudolf Schuster, former Košice mayor and the second president of Slovakia (1999–2004)
 Radoslav Školník, professional Slovak footballer, born in Košice
 Juraj Slafkovský, ice hockey player for the Montreal Canadiens. Selected first overall in the 2022 NHL Draft
 Koloman Sokol, artist, founder of Slovak graphic art, deemed "Slovak Picasso", studied in Košice
 Egon Steuer, head coach of the national basketball team of the Netherlands, born in Košice
 Aurel Stodola, engineer, physicist and inventor, studied in Košice
 Marek Svatoš, former ice hockey player for the Colorado Avalanche
 Ferenc Szálasi, politician leader of the Arrow Cross Party, born in Košice

T
 Ladislav Troják, ice hockey player

V
Cyril Vasiľ, eparchial Bishop of Slovak Catholic Eparchy of Košice

Z
Peter Žiga, Minister of Environment (2012-2016) and Economy (2016-2020) of Slovakia

References

!
Kosice
People from Kosice